Edmundo Ichillumpa (born 13 March 1957) is a Peruvian wrestler. He competed in two events at the 1988 Summer Olympics.

References

1957 births
Living people
Peruvian male sport wrestlers
Olympic wrestlers of Peru
Wrestlers at the 1988 Summer Olympics
Place of birth missing (living people)
20th-century Peruvian people